Christa Winkel (born 28 April 1959) is an Austrian equestrian. She competed in two events at the 1984 Summer Olympics.

References

External links
 

1959 births
Living people
Austrian female equestrians
Austrian dressage riders
Olympic equestrians of Austria
Equestrians at the 1984 Summer Olympics
Place of birth missing (living people)